ArchBang Linux is a simple lightweight rolling release Linux distribution based on a minimal Arch Linux operating system with the i3 window manager, but was previously using the Openbox windows manager. ArchBang is especially suitable for high performance on old or low-end hardware with limited resources. ArchBang's aim is to provide a simple out-of-the-box Arch-based Linux distribution with a pre-configured i3 desktop suite, adhering to Arch principles.

ArchBang has also been recommended as a fast installation method for people who have experience installing Arch Linux but want to avoid the more demanding default installation of Arch Linux when reinstalling it on another PC.

History
Inspired by CrunchBang Linux (which was derived from Debian), ArchBang was originally conceived and founded in a forum thread posted on the CrunchBang Forums by Willensky Aristide (a.k.a. Will X TrEmE). Aristide wanted a rolling release with the Openbox setup that Crunchbang came with. Arch Linux provided the light configurable rolling release system that was needed as a base for the Openbox desktop. With the encouragement and help of many in the CrunchBang community, and the addition of developer Pritam Dasgupta (a.k.a. sHyLoCk), the project began to take form. The goal was to make Arch Linux look like CrunchBang. 

As of April 16, 2012, the new project leader is Stan McLaren.

Installation
ArchBang is available as an x86-64 ISO file for live CD installation or installed on a USB flash drive. The live CD is designed to allow the user to test the operating system prior to installation.

ArchBang comes with a modified Arch Linux graphical installation script for installation and also provides a simple, easy to follow, step-by-step installation guide.

Receptions 
Jesse Smith reviewed the ArchBang 2011 for DistroWatch Weekly:

Smith also reviewed ArchBang 2013.09.01.

Whitson Gordon from Lifehacker wrote review about ArchBang in 2011:

References

External links 

 
ArchBang on DistroWatch
ArchBang on OpenSourceFeed Gallery

Arch-based Linux distributions
Linux distributions without systemd
Operating system distributions bootable from read-only media
Pacman-based Linux distributions
Rolling Release Linux distributions
X86-64 Linux distributions
Linux distributions